Hibiscus platanifolius, the maple-leaved mallow, is a species of flowering tree in the mallow family, Malvaceae, that is native to the India and Sri Lanka. In Sri Lankan texts, the plant is widely known by its synonym H. eriocarpus. The tree is about 8m tall. Leaves are cordate at base; hairy; trilobed. Flowers show axillary panicles where flowers show typical Hibiscus flower colors, pink with dark center. Fruit is a capsule.

Common names
 Kannada - Bili daasavaala, Daasaala, Daasaani 
 Telugu - Kondabenda, Kondagogu, Kondajana punara

References

External links
Potential Antioxidant, Hypoglycemic and Hypolipidemic Effect of Leaves of Hibiscus platanifolius

platanifolius
Flora of India (region)
Flora of Sri Lanka